2010 in Chinese football involved the national competitions of the Chinese football league system and the national team.

National teams competitions

Men's senior team

2011 AFC Asian Cup qualification
Group D

EAFF Championship

Friendly matches

Women's senior team

Women's EAFF Championship
The final competition was held in Tokyo, Japan in February 2010. The North Korean women's team withdrew from the tournament in January 2010, and were replaced by the Chinese Taipei side, the runners-up from the semi-final tournament.

2010 Algarve Cup
Group A

2010 AFC Women's Asian Cup
Group B

2010 Asian Games
Group A

Note: China PR and Korea Republic finished with identical records. With both teams facing each other  in the final group match, a penalty shootout was taken place on the spot to determine the group winner. Korea Republic won 8–7 on penalties.

Both teams ended the group stage with equal points, goal difference and goal scored. A penalty shootout was therefore taken immediately after the 90-minute match to determine the group winner in which Korea Republic won.

Friendly matches

Men's U-23 team

2010 Asian Games
Group A

Friendly matches

Men's U-20 team

2010 AFC U-19 Championship
Group A

Friendly matches

2010 Milk Cup

2010 Weifang Cup

2010 Sendai Cup

Men's U-17 team

2010 AFC U-16 Championship
Group D

AEGON Future Cup
Group A

Women's U-20 team

International tournament in Russia
Group B

Domestic competitions

Chinese Super League

China League One

China League Two

North Division

South Division

Playoffs
First round

Semi-finals / Promotion finals

Champions final

International clubs competitions

AFC Champions League

Group E

Group F

Group G

Group H

Round of 16

References
China fixture list at Fifa

 
Seasons in Chinese football
Chinese